Ángel Barja Iglesias (5 October 1938, in Santa Cruz de Terroso, Villardevós, Spain – 12 February 1987) was a Spanish composer.

Works
La Cueva de Montesinos (1974)

References

1938 births
1987 deaths